Rat poison is a pest control chemical for killing rodents.

Rat poison may also refer to:

ratpoison, a computer program
Rat Poison, a remix of "Poison" (The Prodigy song)